The Under Secretary of Homeland Security for Science and Technology is a high level civilian official in the United States Department of Homeland Security. The Under Secretary, as head of the Science and Technology Directorate at DHS, is the principal staff assistant and adviser to both the Secretary of Homeland Security and the Deputy Secretary of Homeland Security for all DHS technological research.

The Under Secretary is appointed from civilian life by the president with the consent of the Senate to serve at the pleasure of the president.

Overview
The Under Secretary of Homeland Security for Science and Technology is responsible for scientific and technological research designed to provide new security and resilience innovations.

Reporting officials
Officials reporting to the USHS(S&T) include:
Deputy Under Secretary of Homeland Security for Science and Technology
Director of Support to the Homeland Security Enterprise and First Responders
Director
Homeland Security Advanced Research Projects Agency
Borders and Maritime Security Division
Chemical and Biological Defense Division
Cyber Security Division
Explosive Division
Resilient Systems Division
Director of CDS Capability Development Support
Director of Research and Development Partnership

Budget

References